The Barstool Prophets were a rock band formed in Cornwall, Ontario, in 1989 and active throughout the 1990s. The members were bassist Glenn Forrester, singer/songwriter Graham Greer, guitarist Al Morier, and drummer Bobby Tamas. In 1995, The Georgia Straight called them "one of the best guitar-rock bands to emerge in Canada since The Tragically Hip."

History
Originally known as the 'Wallflowers', the band changed its name due to avoid confusion with the American band of the same name. They moved to Ottawa to attend university and, in 1992, independently released their first album, Deflowered.  They landed tours with Odds, 54-50, Moist, and The Age of Electric, then opened for Dave Matthews Band. Along the way, they sold 8,000 copies of the album and built a solid fan base.

In 1994, the band was signed to Mercury Records and released Crank in 1995. This album initially produced two hit singles: "Mankindman" and "Paranoia", which charted in the top-10 in Canada. The videos for both songs got heavy rotation on MuchMusic  and "Paranoia" was used in the soundtrack for the 1995 film Never Talk to Strangers. They played the MuchMusic stage several times, toured with Junkhouse and Headstones, and landed a US distribution deal. A third single, "Little Death (Oh Mary Mary)" charted and sales hit 50,000, certifying the album gold.

Barstool Prophets released the third album, Last of the Big Game Hunters, in 1997. From this album, "Last of the Big Game Hunters", "Upside Down" and "Friend of Mine" all charted in the top-20. They spent the next two years touring, with I Mother Earth, The Tea Party, Our Lady Peace and Big Sugar.

Between non-stop touring and the turmoil of record label mergers and losses, the band members had had enough and broke up in 1999. Greer went on to produce two solo albums: Moonlight Graham and Graham Greer. Morier released three solo albums: Ensemble, Distance and Images.

In 2015, Barstool Prophets reunited to play a concert in Ottawa in celebration of the 20th anniversary of the release of their first album. They played another concert in 2016 and four in 2017. Their most recent show was in 2018.

Discography 

Albums
Birdman (1992, as 'Wallflowers'), Independent
Deflowered (1993), Independent
Crank (1995), Mercury Records (#63 Canada )
Last of the Big Game Hunters (1997), Mercury Records
Greatest Hits (2015), Stool Sample Music

Singles

References

External links
 Barstool Prophets Site
 Graham Greer's site
 Al Morier's site
 CanadianBands.com entry
 

Canadian alternative rock groups
Musical groups established in 1989
Musical groups disestablished in 1999
Musical groups from Ontario
Cornwall, Ontario
1989 establishments in Ontario
1999 disestablishments in Ontario